William Rupert Clarence Robinson (13 August 1890 – 14 March 1969) was an Australian rules footballer who played with Carlton in the Victorian Football League (VFL).

Robinson was the centre half-back in Carlton's 1915 premiership team. He also played in the 1916 VFL Grand Final, which Carlton lost.

He won the Stawell Gift in 1914.

References

1890 births
Australian rules footballers from Victoria (Australia)
Carlton Football Club players
Carlton Football Club Premiership players
Footscray Football Club (VFA) players
Stawell Gift winners
1969 deaths
One-time VFL/AFL Premiership players